The  Chũ also called Minh Đức River is a river of Lạng Sơn Province in northeastern Vietnam. The 175 kilometre long river originates from Dinh Lap mountain.

The river is very deep . It is narrower and more turbulent upstream and becomes wider and smoother.

Rivers of Lạng Sơn province
Rivers of Bắc Giang province